Jousse may refer to:

Joussé - a commune in Western France
Marcel Jousse - French anthropologist and linguist